Nick Bryan (born 22 October 2001) is a professional Australian rules footballer playing for the Essendon Football Club in the Australian Football League (AFL). He was recruited by the Essendon Football Club with the 38th overall selection in the 2019 AFL Draft. He made his debut in round 7, 2021 against Carlton.

References

Australian players of Australian rules football
Essendon Football Club players
2001 births
Living people